Grendel is the antagonist in the Anglo-Saxon epic poem Beowulf.

Grendel or Grendal may also refer to:

In literature:
 "Grendel" (short story) by Larry Niven, written in 1968
Grendel (novel), by John Gardner (1971) that retells Beowulf from Grendel's point of view
 Grendel (comics), a long-running series by Matt Wagner that started in the 1980s, featuring a fictional assassin called Grendel
 Grendels, predatory alien species in the science-fiction novels The Legacy of Heorot (1987) and Beowulf's Children (1995)

In music:
 Grendel (band), a Netherlands-based dark electro/hard EBM band
 Grendel (opera), an opera composed by Elliot Goldenthal and directed by Julie Taymor
 "Grendel", a song by Marillion, B-side to their first single "Market Square Heroes"
 "Grendel", a song on the album Diary by Sunny Day Real Estate

In media:
 Grendel (film), a made-for-television motion picture adaptation of the Beowulf poem produced by the Sci Fi Channel
 Grendel Grendel Grendel,  an animated film based on John Gardner's novel and starring Peter Ustinov
 Beowulf & Grendel, a 2005 film
 Grendel, the Holy City in the Scrapped Princess anime

In computing:
 Grendel, a species in the artificial life computer program Creatures
 Mozilla Grendel, a Java-based e-mail and Usenet client
 The NSDF designation given to the Soviet bomber class ship in Battlezone
 Grendal, a character in the computer game Mace: The Dark Age

People:
Erik Grendel, Slovak footballer
 Grendel Briarton, pseudonym for author Reginald Bretnor

Other uses:
 Grendel, a superheavyweight combat robot in BattleBots
 6.5mm Grendel, a rifle cartridge developed by Alexander Arms
 Grendel Inc., a United States firearms manufacturer which produced among others:
 Grendel P30
 Grendel R31
 Grendel S16
 Grendel's Den, a bar and restaurant in Cambridge, Massachusetts, U.S.
 Mount Grendal, a mountain in Antarctica

See also 
 Beowulf (disambiguation)